In mathematics, the Prékopa–Leindler inequality is an integral inequality closely related to the reverse Young's inequality, the Brunn–Minkowski inequality and a number of other important and classical inequalities in analysis. The result is named after the Hungarian mathematicians András Prékopa and László Leindler.

Statement of the inequality
Let 0 < λ < 1 and let f, g, h : Rn → [0, +∞) be non-negative real-valued measurable functions defined on n-dimensional Euclidean space Rn. Suppose that these functions satisfy

for all x and y in Rn. Then

Essential form of the inequality
Recall that the essential supremum of a measurable function f : Rn → R is defined by

This notation allows the following essential form of the Prékopa–Leindler inequality: let 0 < λ < 1 and let f, g ∈ L1(Rn; [0, +∞)) be non-negative absolutely integrable functions. Let

Then s is measurable and

The essential supremum form was given by Herm Brascamp and Elliott Lieb. Its use can change the left side of the inequality. For example, a function g that takes the value 1 at exactly one point will not usually yield a zero left side in the "non-essential sup" form but it will always yield a zero left side in the "essential sup" form.

Relationship to the Brunn–Minkowski inequality
It can be shown that the usual Prékopa–Leindler inequality implies the Brunn–Minkowski inequality in the following form: if 0 < λ < 1 and A and B are bounded, measurable subsets of Rn such that the Minkowski sum (1 − λ)A + λB is also measurable, then

where μ denotes n-dimensional Lebesgue measure. Hence, the Prékopa–Leindler inequality can also be used to prove the Brunn–Minkowski inequality in its more familiar form: if 0 < λ < 1 and A and B are non-empty, bounded, measurable subsets of Rn such that (1 − λ)A + λB is also measurable, then

Applications in probability and statistics

Log-concave distributions
The Prékopa–Leindler inequality is useful in the theory of log-concave distributions, as it can be used to show that log-concavity is preserved by marginalization and independent summation of log-concave distributed random variables.

Suppose that H(x,y) is a log-concave distribution for (x,y) ∈ Rm × Rn, so that by definition we have

and let M(y) denote the marginal distribution obtained by integrating over x:

Let y1, y2 ∈ Rn and 0 < λ < 1 be given. Then equation satisfies condition with h(x) = H(x,(1 − λ)y1 + λy2),  f(x) = H(x,y1) and g(x) = H(x,y2), so the Prékopa–Leindler inequality applies. It can be written in terms of M as

which is the definition of log-concavity for M.

To see how this implies the preservation of log-convexity by independent sums, suppose that X and Y are independent random variables with log-concave distribution. Since the product of two log-concave functions is log-concave, the joint distribution of (X,Y) is also log-concave. Log-concavity is preserved by affine changes of coordinates, so the distribution of (X + Y, X − Y) is log-concave as well. Since the distribution of X+Y is a marginal over the joint distribution of (X + Y, X − Y), we conclude that X + Y has a log-concave distribution.

Applications to concentration of measure
The Prékopa–Leindler inequality can be used to prove results about concentration of measure.

Theorem Let , and set . Let  denote the standard Gaussian pdf, and  its associated measure. Then .

The proof of this theorem goes by way of the following lemma:

Lemma In the notation of the theorem, .

To verify the hypothesis of the inequality, note that we only need to consider , in which case  . This allows us to calculate:

 

Since , the PL-inequality immediately gives the lemma.

Applying the lemma and rearranging proves the result.

References

Further reading

 
 

Geometric inequalities
Integral geometry
Real analysis
Theorems in analysis
Theorems in measure theory